Cladonia cristatella, commonly known as the British soldiers lichen or the British soldiers cup lichen, is a fruticose, cup lichen belonging to the family Cladoniaceae. The species was first described scientifically by American botanist Edward Tuckerman in 1858.

See also
List of Cladonia species

References

External links

Lichens described in 1858
cristatella
Lichen species
Taxa named by Edward Tuckerman